Alexander Nuyles (born July 25, 1989) is a Filipino professional basketball player who last played for the Bicol Volcanoes of the Maharlika Pilipinas Basketball League (MPBL). He was drafted 9th overall by the Rain or Shine Elasto Painters in the 2013 PBA draft. He was left unprotected by Rain or Shine Elasto Painters in the 2014 PBA Expansion Draft. He was then selected by the Blackwater Elite with their third pick in the expansion draft.
In March 2015, Nuyles was traded to Kia (now Mahindra) for Reil Cervantes.

UAAP career statistics

PBA career statistics

Correct as of July 18, 2015 

Season-by-season averages

|-
| align="left" | 
| align="left" | Rain or Shine
| 48 || 10.6 || .399 || .091 || .571 || 1.5 || .7 || .3 || .1 || 3.5
|-
| align="left" | 
| align="left" | Blackwater / Kia
| 25 || 16.3 || .322 || .125 || .491 || 1.8 || 1.0 || .4 || .1 || 5.8
|-
| align="left" | Career
| align="left" |
| 73 || 12.6 || .358 || .105 || .535 || 1.6 || .8 || .3 || .1 || 4.3

References

1989 births
Living people
Basketball players from Albay
Blackwater Bossing players
Filipino men's basketball players
Terrafirma Dyip players
Rain or Shine Elasto Painters players
Shooting guards
Small forwards
TNT Tropang Giga players
Adamson Soaring Falcons basketball players
Maharlika Pilipinas Basketball League players
Rain or Shine Elasto Painters draft picks